Shawn Wooden may refer to:

 Shawn Wooden (American football) (born 1973), former American football safety
 Shawn Wooden (politician), American politician